The Chinese Soviet Republic (CSR) was an East Asian proto-state in China, proclaimed on 7 November 1931 by Chinese communist leaders Mao Zedong and Zhu De in the early stages of the Chinese Civil War. The discontiguous territories of the CSR included 18 provinces and 4 counties under the communists' control. The CSR's government was located in its largest component territory, the Jiangxi–Fujian Soviet (alternatively romanised as the Kiangsi–Fukien Soviet). Due to the importance of the Jiangxi–Fujian Soviet in the CSR's early history, the names Jiangxi Soviet and Kiangsi Soviet are sometimes used to refer to the CSR as a whole. Other component territories of the CSR included the Northeastern Jiangxi, Hunan-Jiangxi, Hunan-Hubei-Jiangxi, Hunan-Western Hubei, Hunan-Hubei-Sichuan-Guizhou, Shaanxi-Gansu, Szechuan-Shensi, Hubei-Henan-Anhui and Haifeng-Lufeng Soviets.

Mao Zedong was both CSR state chairman and prime minister; he led the state and its government. Mao's tenure as head of a "small state within a state" gave him experience in mobile warfare and peasant organization; this experience helped him accomplish the Communist reunification of China during the late 1940s. 

The CSR was eventually destroyed by the Kuomintang (KMT)'s National Revolutionary Army in a series of 1934 encirclement campaigns. Following the Xi'an Incident of December 1936, the Communists and Kuomintang formed an uneasy "United Front" to resist Japanese pressure, which led to the Communists recognizing at least for the moment Chiang Kai-shek as China's leader and the official dissolution of the Soviet Republic on 22 September 1937 with remnants reconstituted as the Yan'an Soviet formed by the leadership of the CSR.

Establishment 

On 7 November 1931 (the anniversary of the 1917 Russian October Revolution) a National Soviet People's Delegates Conference was held in Ruijin, Jiangxi province. Ruijin was the national capital, and the Republic had received assistance from the Soviet Union to host the gathering. The Chinese Soviet Republic was born, although most of China was still controlled by the National Government of the Republic of China; an opening ceremony was held for the new country, and Mao Zedong and other communists attended the military parade. Because the CSR had its own national bank, printed its own money and collected its own taxes, this is considered the beginning of the Two Chinas.

With Mao Zedong as both head of state, "Chairman of the Central Executive Committee") and head of government ("Chairman of the Council of People's Commissars"), the CSR gradually expanded. At its peak it covered over —a large part of two provinces (with Tingzhou in Fujian)—and had a population of three million. Its economy was more stable than most of the areas controlled by Chinese warlords. In addition to the militia and guerilla soldiers, the well-armed Chinese Red Army had reached more than 140,000 soldiers by the early 1930s. The Chinese Red Army had modern communications technology (telephones, telegraph and radio, which the warlords' armies lacked), and transmitted wireless coded messages while breaking nationalist codes. At the time, only Chiang Kai-shek's army could match the communist forces.

The Kuomintang, led by Chiang Kai-shek, felt threatened by the CSR. It induced the Chinese warlords to have the National Revolutionary Army besiege the CSR, launching what Chiang and his fellow nationalists called encirclement campaigns. The communists responded with what they called counter-encirclement campaigns. Chiang Kai-shek's first, second and third encirclement campaigns were defeated by the Chinese Red Army, led by Mao. However, after the third counter-encirclement campaign Mao was replaced by Wang Ming, a Chinese communist returning from the Soviet Union. The Chinese Red Army was commanded by a three-man committee, which included Wang Ming's associates Otto Braun (the Comintern military advisor), Bo Gu and Zhou Enlai. The CSR then began a rapid decline, due to its extreme left-wing governance and incompetent military command. The new leadership could not rid itself of Mao's influence (which continued during the fourth encirclement campaign), which temporarily protected the communists. However, due to the dominance of the new communist leadership after the fourth counter-encirclement campaign, the Red Army was nearly halved. Most of its equipment was lost during Chiang's fifth encirclement campaign; this began in 1933 and was orchestrated by Chiang's German advisers, who advocated encircling the CSR with fortified blockhouses. This was effective; in an effort to break the blockade the Red Army besieged the forts many times, suffering heavy casualties and only limited success. As a result, the CSR shrank significantly due to the Chinese Red Army's manpower and material losses.

State structure

Intelligence 
The communists appeared doomed when attacked by the nationalists. However, Zhou Enlai had planted more than a dozen moles in Chiang Kai-shek's inner circle, including his general headquarters at Nanchang. One of Zhou's most important agents, Mo Xiong, was not a communist; however, his contributions saved the Chinese Communist Party and the Chinese Red Army.

With recommendations from Chiang Kai-shek's secretary-general Yang Yongtai (who was unaware of Mo's communist activities), Mo rose in Chiang Kai-shek's regime and became an important member in his general headquarters during the early 1930s. In January 1934, Chiang Kai-shek appointed him administrator and commander-in-chief of the Fourth Special District in northern Jiangxi. Mo used his position to plant more than a dozen communist agents in Chiang's general headquarters, including Liu Yafo (who introduced the Chinese Communist Party), Xiang Yunian (his communist handler, whom he hired as his secretary) and Lu Zhiying (acting head of the spy ring, under the command of Zhou Enlai).

After successfully besieging the Ruijin area (the CSR capital) and occupying most of the CSR itself, Chiang was confident that he could defeat the communists in a final decisive strike. In late September 1934 he distributed his top-secret "Iron Bucket Plan" to general headquarters at Lushan (the summer substitute for Nanchang), which detailed the final push to annihilate the communist forces. Chiang planned 30 blockade lines supported by 30 barbed wire fences (most electrified) in a  radius around Ruijin to starve the communists. In addition, more than 1,000 trucks were to be mobilized in a rapid-reaction force to prevent a communist breakout. Realizing the certainty of communist annihilation, Mo Xiong handed the several-kilogram document to Xiang Yunian the same night—risking his life and those of his family.

With help from Liu Yafo and Lu Zhiying, communist agents copied the intelligence into four dictionaries and Xiang Yunian was tasked with bringing it to the CSR. The trip was hazardous, since the nationalist forces arrested and executed anyone attempting to cross the blockade. Xiang Yunian hid in the mountains, knocking out four of his teeth with a rock and causing his face to swell. Disguised as a beggar, he tore off the covers of the four dictionaries and covered them with spoiled food at the bottom of his bag. Crossing several blockade lines, he reached Ruijin on 7 October 1934. The intelligence provided by Mo Xiong convinced the communists in the CSR to abandon their base and retreat before Chiang could reinforce his blockade lines with barbed-wire fences. They mobilized trucks and troops, saving themselves from annihilation.

Finance
On 1 February 1932, the Chinese Soviet Republic National Bank was established, with Mao Zemin as president. The CSR Central Mint issued three types of currency: a paper bill, a copper coin and a silver dollar.

Banknotes

The Central Mint briefly issued both paper bills and copper coins. Neither circulated for long, primarily because the currency could not be used in the rest of China. The paper bill had "Chinese Soviet Republic National Bank" printed on the bill in traditional Chinese characters and a picture of Vladimir Lenin.

Copper coins
Like the paper bill, copper coins issued by the Central Mint also had "Chinese Soviet Republic" engraved in traditional Chinese. Since coins last longer than paper bills, these coins were issued (and circulated) in a much greater quantity. However, these coins are rarer than the paper bill; copper was needed for ammunition, and these copper coins were recalled and replaced by silver dollars.

Silver dollars
The predominant currency produced by the Central Mint was the silver dollar. Unlike the bills and copper coins, the silver dollars had no communist symbols; they were a copy of silver dollars produced by other mints in China (including the popular coin with the head of Yuan Shikai and the eagle silver dollar of the Mexican peso). This, and the fact that the coin was made of silver, enabled them to be circulated in the rest of China; thus, it was the currency of choice.

When the Chinese Red Army's First Front began its Long March in October 1934, the communist bank was part of the retreating force; fourteen bank employees, over a hundred coolies and a company of soldiers escorted them with the money and mint machinery. An important duty of the bank was, when the Chinese Red Army stayed in a location for longer than a day, to have the local populace exchange communist paper bills and copper coins for currency used in the nationalist-controlled regions to avoid prosecution by the nationalists after the communists left. After the Zunyi Conference it was decided that carrying the entire bank on the march was impractical, and on 29 January 1935, at Tucheng the bank employees burned all communist paper bills and destroyed the mint machinery. By the end of the Long March in October 1935, only eight of the original fourteen employees were left; the other six had died along the way.

Taxation
In November 1931, the National Tax Bureau was founded. In 2002, the original building was renovated for the public.

Postage stamps
The Directorate General of Chinese Soviet Posts was founded in Ruijin on 1 May 1932. The first stamps were designed by Huang Yaguang and printed lithographically by the Printing House of the Ministry of Finance in Ruijin. White paper or newspaper was used. They were imperforate, and denominated in the Chinese Soviet silver-dollar currency. They are fairly rare, and sought after by collectors. There are also many forgeries and bogus issues imitating early stamps from the communist areas.

Collapse and the Long March
On 10 October 1934 the three-man communist leadership issued an order to retreat; on 16 October the Chinese Red Army begun what was later known as the Long March, leaving the CSR. Seventeen days after the main communist force left its base, the nationalists realized they had escaped when they reached the abandoned city of Ruijin on 5 November. The original destination was He Long's communist base in Hubei; the final destination (Yan'an) was not chosen until later, after the rise of Mao Zedong. To avoid panic, the goal was kept secret from most people (including Mao Zedong); the public was told that a portion of the Chinese Red Army would be engaged in mobile warfare with the nationalist forces, and this part of the army was renamed the “Field Army”.

By fall 1934, the communists faced annihilation, and the situation had convinced Mao Zedong and his supporters that the communists should abandon their bases in the CSR. However, the leadership refused to accept the prospect of failure and still hoped to defeat the nationalist forces. The three-man committee devised a diversionary plan and a regrouping after a temporary retreat. After the regrouping a counterattack would be launched with the earlier diversion forces, driving the nationalists out of the CSR.

The first movement of the retreating diversion were led by Fang Zhimin. Fang (and his deputy, Xun Weizhou) were the first to break through Kuomintang lines in June, followed by Xiao Ke in August. These movements surprised the Kuomintang, who were numerically superior to the communists and did not expect an attack on their fortified perimeter. However, Fang Zhimin's force was crushed after its initial success and Xun Weizhou was killed in action. Nearly every commander was wounded and captured alive (including Fang Zhimin), and all were executed by the nationalists. The only exception was Su Yu, who escaped. Xiao Ke fared no better, although his forces initially broke through and reached He Long's communist base in Hubei. Even with their combined forces they could not challenge the nationalist forces, and did not return until the establishment of the People's Republic of China 15 years later.

The failure of the diversionary force resulted in their loss of contact with the CSR. The communist leadership failed to coordinate its next move, still believing that a temporary retreat near (or within) the CSR would allow them to recover and counterattack.

Main retreating force
The portion of the First Front Red Army engaged in mobile warfare was actually the bulk of the communist force making a general retreat, and was much diminished from its peak of more than 140,000 men. With most of its equipment lost, many Chinese Red Army soldiers were forced to arm themselves with ancient weaponry. According to the Statistical Chart of Field Army Personnel, Weaponry, Ammunition, and Supply' completed by the Chinese Red Army on 8 October 1934 (two days before the Long March began), the Long March forces consisted of:

Combat formations
Five combat corps, totaling 72,313 men:
First Corps (the largest, with 19,880 men)
Third Corps
Fifth Corps
Eighth Corps (the newest and smallest, with 10,922 men)
Ninth Corps
Two columns:
Central Committee First Column
Central Committee Second Column

The corps and columns had a total of 86,859 men.

Weaponry
The Statistical Chart of Field Army Personnel, Weaponry, Ammunition, and Supply (in the People's Liberation Army Archives) provided weapons and provisions for the Long March. The weapons included:
 Artillery: 39 total
 Mortars: 38
 Mountain gun: 1 (originally not included; added later)
 Breech-loading firearms: 33,244 total (with 1,858,156 rounds of ammunition); of these a total of 29,016 were distributed to the five corps, including:
 Rifles: 25,317
 Heavy machine guns: 333
 Light machine guns: 285
 Submachine guns: 28
 Handguns: 2,804
 Other weapons included:
 Lances: 6,101
 Sabers: 882

Other weapons were also deployed which were not counted. These included:
 Muzzle-loading and smooth-bore muskets
 Flintlock and snaphance guns
 Matchlock and wheellock guns
 Spears and rakes: Later in the Long March, spears were more useful as canes.
 Axes and poles: Later in the Long March, poles were useful as building material and for stretchers.
 Daggers and knives

Provisions included:
 Winter clothing: 83,100 sets
 Horses: 338
 Herbal medicines: 35,700 kg
 Salt: 17,413 kg
 Currency: 1.642 million CSR dollars

 Dissolution 
The Chinese Soviet Republic continued to exist formally, since the communists still controlled some areas such as the Hubei-Henan-Shaanxi Soviet. Bao'an was, for a time, the capital until the communist government was moved to Yan'an. The Chinese Soviet Republic was dissolved on 22 September 1937 when the Chinese Communist Party issued, in the Second United Front, its manifesto on unity with the Kuomintang; the Second Sino-Japanese War was only a few weeks old. The Chinese Communist Party remained in de facto control of Yan'an, which was its stronghold for the remainder of the war with Japan.

 See also 

Communist-controlled China (1927–1949)
Two Chinas
Chinese Red Army
People's Republic of China
National Revolutionary Army
Whampoa Military Academy
History of the Republic of China
Military of the Republic of China
History of China
Politics of the People's Republic of China
Chinese political parties
Futian incident
Anti-Bolshevik League incidentChina's Red Army Marches, Agnes Smedley's book on the Jiangxi Soviet

 Notes 

 References 

 Citations 

 Sources 

 Yang Stamp Catalogue of The People's Republic of China (Liberated Area)'' Nai-Chiang Yang, 1998, 7th edition.

External links 

 Preface to Fundamental Laws of the Chinese Soviet Republic
 flags from FOTW website
 Coins of the Szechuan-Shensi Soviet
 coins
 12 stamps (explanatory caption in Simplified Chinese)

 
 
1931 establishments in China
1937 disestablishments in China
Chinese Civil War
Former socialist republics
Former countries in Chinese history
States and territories established in 1931
Soviet republics
Former countries of the interwar period
East China